The 2003 NCAA men's volleyball tournament was the 34th annual tournament to determine the national champion of NCAA men's collegiate indoor volleyball. The single elimination tournament was played at The Pyramid in Long Beach, California during May 2003.

Lewis defeated BYU in the final match, 3–2 (42–44, 30–27, 30–21, 23–30, 15–12), to win their first national title. However, the NCAA Committee on Infractions ultimately vacated the Flyers' tournament appearance, wins, and championship. The championship was not reawarded to BYU. Lewis (29–6), coached by Dave Deuser, would have become the first non-Division I program to win the NCAA men's volleyball tournament. This was also the first final in the tournament’s history where both finalists were from a state other than California. All other finals before had at least one California school participating.

Lewis' Gustavo Meyer was originally named the tournament's Most Outstanding Player. However, this award was revoked when Lewis' title was vacated by the NCAA. Additionally, Meyer and teammates Fabiano Barreto and Ryan Stuntz were all removed from the six-man All Tournament Team.

Qualification
Until the creation of the NCAA Men's Division III Volleyball Championship in 2012, there was only a single national championship for men's volleyball. As such, all NCAA men's volleyball programs, whether from Division I, Division II, or Division III, were eligible. A total of 4 teams were invited to contest this championship.

Note: Lewis' appearance, including their championship, was vacated by the NCAA Committee on Infractions.

Tournament bracket 
Site: The Pyramid, Long Beach, California

Note: Lewis' wins were all vacated by the NCAA Committee on Infractions.

All tournament team 
 Gustavo Meyer, Lewis (Most outstanding player) (Vacated)
 Fabiano Barreto, Lewis (Vacated)
 Ryan Stuntz, Lewis (Vacated)
 Rafael Paal, BYU
 Jonathan Alleman, BYU
 Carlos Guerra, Penn State

See also 
 NCAA Men's National Collegiate Volleyball Championship
 NCAA Women's Volleyball Championships (Division I, Division II, Division III)

References

2003
NCAA Men's Volleyball Championship
NCAA Men's Volleyball Championship
2003 in sports in California
Volleyball in California